"Get in Line" is a song by Canadian alternative rock group Barenaked Ladies. It was released in 1999 from the soundtrack of the TV series King of the Hill. The song was released on October 11, 1999, and later appeared on the band's compilation release, Disc One: All Their Greatest Hits (1991–2001). "Get in Line" reached number 18 in Canada and number 28 on the US Billboard Adult Top 40.

The CD cover features the face of King of the Hill character Dale Gribble.

Music video
The music video, the first of many of the group's videos directed by Phil Harder, features the band playing the song live action in the setting of King of the Hill. It was shot in a warehouse in Seattle.

The video for "Get in Line" is featured in Barenaked Ladies' DVD Barelaked Nadies, as well on the King of the Hill Season 1 DVD set as a special feature (Disc 3 with Dale Gribble).

Charts

Release history

References

Barenaked Ladies songs
1999 singles
1999 songs
Elektra Records singles
King of the Hill
Music videos directed by Phil Harder
Song recordings produced by Don Was
Songs written by Ed Robertson
Songs written by Steven Page